Sheikh Fazlollah Nouri Expressway starts from the end of Tehran-Karaj Freeway. It passes Bakeri Expressway, Shahid Sattari Expressway, Mohammad Ali Jenah Expressway, Yadegar-e-Emam Expressway, Jalal-e-Ale Ahmad Expressway, Resalat Expressway and Hemmat Expressway and reaches Sanat Square in West Town.

Expressways in Tehran